Delosperma ('delos'=evident, 'sperma'=seed) is a genus of around 170 species of succulent plants, formerly included in Mesembryanthemum in the family Aizoaceae. It was defined by English botanist N. E. Brown in 1925. The genus is common in southern and eastern Africa, with a few species in Madagascar, Reunion island,Yemen and Saudi Arabia. Delosperma species, as do most Aizoaceae, have hygrochastic capsules, opening and closing as they wet and dry.

Distinguishing characters
Plants of the genus Delosperma can be distinguished by their seed capsules. When these open (in response to rain), the seeds are exposed and not covered by a protective membrane, like those of most other plants in the family. The membrane is sometimes reduced to just a ledge (a feature shared by the related genus Trichodiadema. The triangular valves, which open outwards when wet, each have distinctive wings on either side.

Delosperma leaves tend to grooved or covered in bladder cells, which are sometimes even extended into hairs. The leaf shape is cylindrical or sometimes flattened.

Delosperma species are long-lived, and flower mostly in the summer. Their flowers vary greatly in colour.

Species
Species include:

Delosperma acuminatum
Delosperma alpina
Delosperma basuticum
Delosperma bosseranum, iceplant
Delosperma cooperi
Delosperma congestum
Delosperma dyeri 
Delosperma echinatum
Delosperma ecklonis
Delosperma esterhuyseniae
Delosperma floribunda
Delosperma hallii
Delosperma harazianum
Delosperma hirtum
Delosperma hallii aff. litorale St. Fancis Bay
Delosperma lavisiae – AGM
Delosperma lehmannii
Delosperma lineare L.Bolus — South Africa (Free State, KwaZulu-Natal), Lesotho
Delosperma lydenburgense
Delosperma nakurense
Delosperma napiforme
Delosperma nubigenum
Delosperma pageanum
Delosperma pergamentaceum
Delosperma sphalmanthoides
Delosperma sutherlandii
Delosperma tradescantiodes

References

External links

Jepson Manual Treatment
USDA Plants Profile: North American Species
Flora of North America
https://worldofsucculents.com/genera/delosperma/
hydropower seed capsule origami

 
Aizoaceae genera
Taxa named by N. E. Brown
Succulent plants